Aneurin Richards  ( – ) was a Welsh international footballer. He was part of the Wales national football team, playing 1 match on 31 October 1931 against Scotland.

See also
 List of Wales international footballers (alphabetical)

References

1902 births
Welsh footballers
Wales international footballers
Place of birth missing
Year of death missing
Association football defenders
Barnsley F.C. players